Réka Rubint (born 28 June 1978 in Kazincbarcika) is a Hungarian fitness instructor and author of various fitness publications and workouts. In 2017, she was listed by Forbes as the 10th most influential Hungarian woman in the media.

Life
Rubint went to a kindergarten in Pusztamonostor. She completed her primary school education at the Székely Mihály Elementary School in Jászberény. She then went to the Kazincbarcic Secondary School for Health and Care for a year, before going back to Jászberény due to the distance from her parents and friends.  She continued her studies at the Lehel Vezér Secondary School and then studied at the ELTE Bárczi Gusztáv Pedagogical Teacher Training College. Her later goals included the completion of the ELTE psychology program.

Her husband is Norbert Schobert. They have three children: Lara, Norbert and Zalán.

Published publications
 Add önmagad – Személyi edződ Rubint Réka
  Szülés után lefogytam!
 Az igényes nők edzésprogramja – Rubint Réka 2.
 Kismama- és életmódkazetta
 Add újra önmagad
 Napi 20 perc önmagadért

References

External links 
 

1978 births
Living people
People from Kazincbarcika
Exercise instructors
Hungarian women writers